A stroke or brain stroke is a medical condition in which poor blood flow to the brain results in cell death.

Stroke or stroking may also refer to:

Arts, entertainment, and media
 Stroke (composition), a 2010 orchestral composition by Joan Tower
 Stroke (film), a 1992 Canadian short film
 Stroke (journal), a cardiology journal
 Stroke: Songs for Chris Knox, a 2009 benefit compilation album
 "The Stroke", a 1981 song by Billy Squier
 The Strokes, a rock band
 "Stroke", a 2019 song by Banks from III
 "Strokin, a 1986 song by Clarence Carter

Health conditions
 Myocardial infarction or heart stroke
 Sunstroke, a condition caused by overexposure to the sun

Sports
 Rowing stroke, the action of moving an oar through the water to propel a boat forward
 Stroke (position), in the sport of rowing, the rower seated closest to the stern
 Stroke, a scuba diver who is not following the rules of Doing It Right
 Stroke play, a scoring system used in golf
 Swimming stroke, a swimming style
 The Stroke (wrestling maneuver)

Writing and graphics
 Stroke (CJK character), part of a Chinese character
 Stroke, a trace of ink in handwriting
 Stroke, a line that makes up part or all of a letter in typeface anatomy
 Stroke, one of the two basic methods of drawing a path in vector graphics
 Bar (diacritic) or stroke
 Slash (punctuation), the typographical character, is also known as a "stroke"

Other uses
 Stroke (engine), a single action of some engines
 Stroke (Fast One), a deception
 Stroke, the recognition, attention or responsiveness that one person gives another in transactional analysis
 Stroke City, a nickname for Derry, Northern Ireland
 Stroking, a form of a social grooming

See also
Different Strokes (disambiguation)